The National Windrush Monument is a bronze sculpture by Basil Watson in Waterloo Station, London. It was unveiled in June 2022 by Prince William, Duke of Cambridge. The monument commemorates the British West Indian immigrants who came to the United Kingdom on board HMT Empire Windrush in 1948, who subsequently became known as the Windrush generation. The inscription accompanying the monument lists the members of the Windrush Committee who commissioned the sculpture, and a poem by Laura Serrant, "You Called ... and We Came".

See also

 Custard Apple (Annonaceae), Breadfruit (Moraceae) and Soursop (Annonaceae) – the first permanent monument to the Windrush generation, unveiled in Hackney, London, in October 2021

References

External links
 

2022 establishments in England
2022 sculptures
Sculptures of children in the United Kingdom
Bronze sculptures in the United Kingdom
Sculptures of men in the United Kingdom
Sculptures of women in the United Kingdom
Statues in London